WDTI, virtual channel 69 (UHF digital channel 23), is a Daystar owned-and-operated television station licensed to Indianapolis, Indiana, United States. The station is owned by the Indianapolis Community Television subsidiary of Word of God Fellowship, itself a subsidiary of the Daystar Television Network. WDTI's offices are located on Crawfordsville Road in northwestern Indianapolis (near Speedway), and its transmitter is located on Walnut Drive, also on the city's northwest side (near Meridian Hills). It is operated separately from low-powered sister station WIPX-LD (channel 51) in Indianapolis.

On cable, WDTI is available on Comcast Xfinity channel 21, Charter Spectrum channel 253 and AT&T U-verse channel 563.

History
Channel 69 first signed on the air on June 6, 1988 as WBUU, an educational independent station founded by Butler University. It changed its call letters to WTBU in 1991.

In 1992, WTBU became the fourth PBS member station in the Indianapolis market—after WFYI (channel 20), Bloomington-based WTIU (channel 30) and Muncie-licensed WIPB (channel 49); through PBS' Program Differentiation Plan, a fraction of the network's programming was distributed between all four stations, with WFYI carrying most of PBS' programs as the primary PBS outlet for the market. In 2004, Butler University sold WTBU to Indianapolis Community Television, Inc., an arm of the Daystar Television Network. The new owners began carrying programming from the religious broadcast network.

Digital television

Digital channel

Analog-to-digital conversion
WDTI shut down its analog signal, over UHF channel 69, on November 10, 2008. The station's digital signal remained on its pre-transition UHF channel 44. Through the use of PSIP, digital television receivers display the station's virtual channel as its former UHF analog channel 69, which was among the high band UHF channels (52-69) that were removed from broadcasting use as a result of the transition.

References

External links
 Official website

Television channels and stations established in 1988
1988 establishments in Indiana
DTI
Daystar (TV network) affiliates